Claude Arpi is French-born author, journalist, historian and tibetologist born in 1949 in Angoulême who lives in Auroville, India. He is the author of several books including The Fate of Tibet: When Big Insects Eat Small Insects, and several articles on Tibet, China, India and Indo-French relations.

Claude Arpi is the director of the Pavilion of Tibetan Culture at Auroville. The 14th Dalai Lama inaugurated the Pavilion, with Claude Arpi in attendance, on 20 January 2009.

Bibliography 
India–Tibet Relations (1947–1962) series:
Tibet: When the Gods Spoke. India Tibet Relations (1947–1962), Part 3, Vij Books, 2019. 
Will Tibet Ever Find Her Soul Again? India Tibet Relations (1947–1962), Part 2, Vij Books, 2018. 
Tibet: The Last Months of a Free Nation. India Tibet Relations (1947–1962), Part 1, Vij Books, 2017. 
Other:
1962 and the McMahon Line Saga, Lancer Publishers, 2013. 
India and her neighbourhood: a French observer's views, Har-Anand Publications, 2005. 
Born in Sin : The Panchsheel Agreement, The Sacrifice of Tibet, Mittal Publications, New Delhi, 2004. 
Cachemire, le paradis perdu, Éditions Philippe Picquier, 2004 . 
Il y a 50 ans : Pondichéry, Éditions Auroville Press, Auroville, 2004
Long and dark shall be the night : the Karma of Tibet, Éditions Auroville Press, Auroville, 2002. 
La politique française de Nehru, La fin des comptoirs français en Inde (1947–1954), Éditions Auroville Press, Auroville, 2002
Tibet, le pays sacrifié, préfacé par le Dalaï Lama, Calmann-Lévy, 2000. .
The Fate of Tibet: When Big Insects Eat Small Insects, Har-Anand Publications, New Delhi, 1999.

References

External links

Website
Homepage

1949 births
Living people
20th-century French historians
French journalists
Journalists from Tamil Nadu
Tibetologists
20th-century French male writers
21st-century French historians
French male non-fiction writers